This is a list of recordings of Elektra, a one-act opera by Richard Strauss with a German-language libretto by Hugo von Hofmannsthal. The work was first performed at the Dresden State Opera on 25 January 1909.

Recordings

References
Notes

Sources
Discography on Classical CD Review, accessed 3 March 2009

Opera discographies
Operas by Richard Strauss